118 Avenue is the designated name of two major arterial roads in central Edmonton, Alberta, Canada, separated by the Edmonton City Centre Airport. The west side services both an industrial area, and a residential area, while the east 118 Avenue, originally Alberta Avenue, is one of the oldest streets in Edmonton outside the downtown core. The name was changed to 118 Avenue in 1914 with the adoption of the grid system. Historically, it was a route between the City of Edmonton in the west and the Town of Beverly in the east. It is also sometimes called the Avenue of Champions. When Beverly was still a separate community from Edmonton, the portion of Alberta Avenue in Beverly was the central business district.  Beverly amalgamated with Edmonton on December 31, 1961.  Following the amalgamation, Beverly's central business district went into a period of decline. The avenue boasts several major landmarks, including Northlands and the Coliseum.

Prior to the opening of Yellowhead Trail in the early 1980s, Highway 16 followed 118 Avenue between Edmonton's eastern city limit and Princess Elizabeth Avenue before continuing west on 111 Avenue.

The Alberta Avenue name only applies for the portion from 109 Street to Wayne Gretzky Drive. Alberta Avenue is targeted for revitalization as part of the Alberta Avenue-Eastwood Business Revitalization Zone.

Neighbourhoods
List of neighbourhoods 118 Avenue runs through, in order from west to east:

Westside
Dovercourt
Woodcroft
Inglewood
Sherbrooke
Prince Charles
Prince Rupert

Eastside
Spruce Avenue
Westwood
Alberta Avenue
Eastwood
Parkdale
Bellevue
Montrose
Highlands
Newton
Beacon Heights
Beverly Heights
Abbottsfield

Major intersections
This is a list of major intersections, starting at the west end of 118 Avenue.

See also 

 List of avenues in Edmonton
 Transportation in Edmonton

References

Roads in Edmonton